The Milice was a Vichy French paramilitary organisation.

Milice may also refer to the following places in Poland:
Milice, Opole Voivodeship (south-west Poland)
Milice, West Pomeranian Voivodeship (north-west Poland)

See also: Militia